Laconi, Làconi in Sardinian language, is a comune (municipality) in the Province of Oristano in the Italian region Sardinia, located about  north of Cagliari and about  east of Oristano.

Laconi borders the following municipalities: Aritzo, Asuni, Gadoni, Genoni, Isili, Meana Sardo, Nuragus, Nurallao, Nureci, Samugheo, Senis, Villanova Tulo.

References

Cities and towns in Sardinia